Eriocottis paradoxella is a moth in the Eriocottidae family. It was described by Staudinger in 1859. It is found in France, Spain and Portugal.

References

Moths described in 1859
Eriocottidae
Moths of Europe